John George Schiechl (August 22, 1917 – February 11, 1964) was an Austrian American professional American football center in the National Football League (NFL) and the All-America Football Conference (AAFC).  He played for the Pittsburgh Steelers, Detroit Lions, Chicago Bears and San Francisco 49ers.

Schiechl was born in San Francisco, California where he attended Balboa High School before matriculating to Santa Clara University. He served in World War II for the United States Navy before rejoining the NFL in 1945.

References

1917 births
1964 deaths
All-American college football players
American football centers
Chicago Bears players
Detroit Lions players
Pittsburgh Steelers players
San Francisco 49ers players
Santa Clara Broncos football players
Players of American football from San Francisco
United States Navy personnel of World War II